Highland Lake is a body of water located within the boundaries of Winchester, Connecticut. It has a surface area of 445 acres and an average depth of 24 feet. The lake is long but not wide, extending approximately three miles from north to south but only half a mile at its widest.  It narrows at two points and therefore divides into three distinct sections, known (from north to south) as First Bay, Second Bay, and Third Bay. Highland Lake achieves its maximum depth of 63 feet toward the center of Second Bay.

The lake is popular for recreational purposes, including boating and fishing. The Connecticut Department of Environmental Protection stocks the lake annually with fish, and considers it a Trophy Trout and Bass Management Lake.

Highland Lake is encircled by Wakefield Boulevard, which is a little over seven miles long, and its shores are heavily built up with residences (both seasonal and year-round) and dotted with many docks. There have been several historical instances of small rogue wakes hitting the area between first and second bay.  Locals attribute that to some underground plate movements between the two areas.

References

Reservoirs in Connecticut